Elk Prairie is an unincorporated community in Phelps County, in the U.S. state of Missouri.

History
The community was named for a prairie near the original town site where elk once were often seen.  A post office called Elk Prairie was established in 1876, and remained in operation until 1915. The community once had a schoolhouse.  A cemetery marks the site.

References

Unincorporated communities in Phelps County, Missouri
Unincorporated communities in Missouri